Bernard N. Nathanson (July 31, 1926 – February 21, 2011) was an American medical doctor and co-founder, in 1969, of the National Association for the Repeal of Abortion Laws (NARAL), later renamed National Abortion Rights Action League. He was also the former director of New York City's Center for Reproductive and Sexual Health, but later became an anti-abortion activist. He was the narrator for the controversial 1984 anti-abortion film The Silent Scream.

Early life and education
Nathanson was born in New York City. His father was an obstetrician/gynecologist, the same career that Nathanson held in his professional life. Nathanson earned his undergraduate degree at Cornell University and in 1949 graduated with a medical degree from McGill University Faculty of Medicine in Montreal.

Career
Nathanson was licensed to practice medicine in New York state in 1952, and became board-certified in obstetrics and gynecology in 1960. He was for a time the director of the Center for Reproductive and Sexual Health (CRASH), then the largest free-standing abortion facility in the world. In 1974, Nathanson wrote: "I am deeply troubled by my own increasing certainty that I had in fact presided over 60,000 deaths." He also wrote that he performed an abortion on a woman whom he had impregnated.

Activism

Pro-abortion rights
Originally an abortion rights activist, Nathanson gained national attention as one of the founding members, along with Lawrence Lader, of the National Association for the Repeal of Abortion Laws (later renamed the National Abortion Rights Action League, and now known as NARAL Pro-Choice America). He worked with Betty Friedan and others for the legalization of abortion in the United States. Their efforts essentially succeeded with the Roe v. Wade decision.

Anti-abortion
With the development of ultrasound in the 1970s, he had the chance to observe a real-time abortion. This led him to reconsider his views on abortion. He is often quoted as saying that abortion is "the most atrocious holocaust in the history of the United States." He wrote the book Aborting America in which he discussed what he called "the dishonest beginnings of the abortion movement." In 1983, Nathanson debated Henry Morgentaler for an hour on a Canadian national superstation. In 1984, he directed and narrated a film titled The Silent Scream, in co-operation with the National Right to Life Committee, which contained the ultrasound video of a mid-term (12 weeks) abortion. His second documentary, Eclipse of Reason, dealt with late-term abortions. He stated that the numbers he once cited for NARAL concerning the number of deaths linked to illegal abortions were "false figures."

Referring to his previous work as an abortion provider and abortion rights activist, he wrote in his 1996 autobiography, Hand of God: "I am one of those who helped usher in this barbaric age." Nathanson developed what he called the "vector theory of life," which states that from the moment of conception, there exists "a self-directed force of life that, if not interrupted, will lead to the birth of a human baby."

Religious conversion
Nathanson grew up Jewish, and for more than ten years after he became anti-abortion, he described himself as an "atheist." In 1996, he converted to Catholicism through the efforts of the Rev. C. John McCloskey. In December 1996, Nathanson was baptized by John Cardinal O'Connor in a private Mass with a group of friends in New York's St. Patrick's Cathedral. He also received Confirmation and first Communion from the cardinal. When asked why he converted to Roman Catholicism, he stated that "no religion matches the special role for forgiveness that is afforded by the Catholic Church."

Personal life and death

Nathanson married four times; his first three marriages ended in divorce.

He died of cancer in New York on February 21, 2011, at the age of 84. He was survived by his fourth wife Christine Reisner-Nathanson whom he married in the church shortly after his 1996 baptism. He was also survived by his son Joseph, from his second marriage with wife Rosemary.

Works
Aborting America Garden City, NY: Doubleday, 1979. . Free to read at Internet Archive
The Silent Scream (1984 documentary). 1979 film free to view on Internet Archive
The Abortion Papers: Inside the Abortion Mentality. New York: Frederick Fell, 1983. . Free to read at Internet Archive
Eclipse of Reason (1987 documentary).
The Hand of God: A Journey from Death to Life by the Abortion Doctor Who Changed His Mind. Washington, D. C.: Regnery, 1996. . Free to read at Internet Archive.

See also

References

External links
 
The Silent Scream, streaming video
 Dr Bernard Nathanson: abortion activist and historian by David Kupelian of WorldNetDaily

1926 births
2011 deaths
American abortion providers
American anti-abortion activists
American people of Jewish descent
American Roman Catholics
Deaths from cancer in New York (state)
Converts to Roman Catholicism from atheism or agnosticism
McGill University alumni
Writers from New York City